Sevaio Mook (born in Amsterdam on 5 October 1996), better known by the stage name Sevn Alias,  is a Dutch rapper.

The son of a Surinamese father and a Surinamese-Antillean mother, he grew up in Amsterdam-West among North African youth and was affected by their music. He was signed to Rotterdam Airlines label releasing mixtapes and albums. In 2018, he had a supporting role in video series Mocro Maffia. A fan of AFC Ajax, he released the single "Herres" as promotion for AFC Ajax's success in the Champions League.

Discography

Studio albums

Collective albums

Mixtapes

Singles

*Did not appear in the official Belgian Ultratop 50 charts, but rather in the bubbling under Ultratip charts.

Featured in

*Did not appear in the official Belgian Ultratop 50 charts, but rather in the bubbling under Ultratip charts.

Other charting songs

*Did not appear in the official Belgian Ultratop 50 charts, but rather in the bubbling under Ultratip charts.

Notes

References

Dutch rappers
1996 births
Living people
Musicians from Amsterdam
Dutch people of Surinamese descent